Bogor Cathedral, formally the Cathedral of the Blessed Virgin Mary (Indonesian: Gereja Santa Perawan Maria), is a historic church building in the Roman Catholic Diocese of Bogor in Bogor, West Java, Indonesia.

A church in Buitenzorg (Dutch name for the area) in 1894 served both Protestants and Catholics. The cathedral was built 1905. During the World War II era, it was desecrated in 1945.

Currently it serves as the seat of the Catholic Diocese of Bogor (Dioecesis bogorensis) which was created in 1961 by the bull Quod Christus by the Pope John XXII, follows the Roman or Latin rite and is under the pastoral responsibility of the Bishop Paskalis Bruno Syukur.

References

Bogor
Roman Catholic cathedrals in Indonesia
Dutch colonial architecture in Indonesia
Churches in Java
Roman Catholic churches completed in 1905
20th-century Roman Catholic church buildings in Indonesia